George Dominic Ranieri (born January 14, 1936) is a Canadian former ice hockey player who played two games in the National Hockey League with the Boston Bruins during the 1956–57 season. The rest of his playing career, which lasted from 1955 to 1965, was spent in the minor leagues.

Career statistics

Regular season and playoffs

External links
 

1936 births
Living people
Barrie Flyers players
Boston Bruins players
Canadian expatriate ice hockey players in the United States
Canadian ice hockey left wingers
Edmonton Flyers (WHL) players
Hamilton Tiger Cubs players
Hershey Bears players
Louisville Rebels players
New York Rovers players
Providence Reds players
Quebec Aces (QSHL) players
Ice hockey people from Toronto
Vancouver Canucks (WHL) players